Diane Patricia Youdale (born 13 February 1970) is an English television personality, who is best known for her role as Jet on the television series Gladiators.

Career
In 1990, Youdale played the She-Wolf in the Finnegan/Pinchuk Company, HTV and MCA Television Entertainment production, She-Wolf of London. The prosthetics required took four hours to apply and three hours to remove.

Youdale trained as a choreographer before joining Gladiators at the age of 22.

In November 1994, she released her first single, I Don't Know, a collaboration with ISM, which reached a peak of 100 on the UK Single Chart. An accompanying album, No Covers, released in the same year, failed to chart.

She left the Gladiators in 1996 after sustaining a neck injury on the show. She then co-hosted the final original series of Finders Keepers with Neil Buchanan in 1996, and in the same year, was the hostess on You Bet!, with Darren Day.

“I was beginning to see more spinal injuries. You can damage your ankle or your knee and it will recover, but breaking your neck – that’s a different story. After my accident, I decided to quit while I could. I decided it wasn’t worth it any more. I wanted to leave while I could still walk out of the studio. I love hiking and I didn’t want that to be taken from me for the sake of someone’s entertainment.”

After attempting to become a presenter, Youdale later re-trained as a psychotherapist.

On 2 July 2008 it was announced that Sky had plans to do a revival of the hit show Gladiators. Diane Youdale, following an interview with Loaded magazine quotes that "Sky reckon they're going to run it for three to four years so I've said to them why not wait until the last ever episode and then I make my comeback then?" she commented. However that will all depend on how well the show does in the ratings. She ended up as a reporter on the show, as well as co-hosting the Gladiators podcast.

Later in 2008, Youdale joined BBC Tees to co-present the Monday-Friday mid-morning show with Neil Green. The show started on 22 September 2008 and Youdale's last show was 21 January 2011.

Youdale briefly appeared as Jet in the second Big Fat Quiz of the '90s special broadcast by Channel 4 in 2013.

Personal life
Diane Youdale was brought up in Billingham. Her father was Jack Youdale who was the BBC Tees astronomer for 30 years.

Youdale dated fellow Gladiator James Crossley (Hunter) for two years before parting due to hectic work schedules.

Youdale married and resided for a period in the London area as she trained in psychotherapy. After separation and divorce, Diane spends her time between North East England and Surrey where she works as a psychotherapist and is launching her own EQ company Soul Dynamics. She enjoys long walks, exercising and is a keen surfer.

References

External links 
 Youdale's home page 
 Diane's presenter page on BBC Tees
 Listen to Diane trying her first Parmo – a real Teesside treat
 
 Details about her live web chats from March 2007

1970 births
Living people
People from Middlesbrough
People from Billingham
English television presenters
British psychotherapists
Gladiators (1992 British TV series)
National Youth Theatre members